Magnus Jansson (born 16 November 1969) is a retired Swedish ice hockey player. Jansson was part of the Djurgården Swedish champions' team of 1991. Jansson made 215 Elitserien appearances for Djurgården.

References

External links

1969 births
Djurgårdens IF Hockey players
Living people
Nacka HK players
Södertälje SK players
Swedish ice hockey coaches
Swedish ice hockey forwards